Burn and Shiver is the third release by Azure Ray (and second full-length album), released by WARM in 2002.

Track listing
All tracks by Azure Ray

"Favorite Cities"  – 3:44
"The New Year"  – 3:44
"Seven Days"  – 3:35
"Home"  – 3:13
"How You Remember"  – 4:14
"Trees Keep Growing"  – 3:16
"A Thousand Years"  – 2:39
"Your Weak Hands"  – 4:57
"While I'm Still Young"  – 3:14
"We Exchanged Words"  – 2:45
"Raining in Athens"  – 4:10
"Rest Your Eyes"  – 2:39

Personnel 

 Eric Bachmann – Arranger, Multi Instruments, Producer, Mixing, Audio Enhancement
 David Barbe – Mixing
 Chris Bilheimer – Art Direction
 Brian Causey – Art Direction
 Jacqueline Ferguson – Piano
 Orenda Fink – Guitar, Trumpet, Keyboards, Vocals, Melodica
 John Golden – Mastering
 Lou Kregel – Illustrations
 Alex McManus – Trombone, Euphonium
 Maria Taylor – Guitar, Piano, Keyboards, Vocals

References 

2002 albums
Azure Ray albums